Jarrow is a Tyne and Wear Metro station, serving the town of Jarrow, South Tyneside in Tyne and Wear, England. It joined the network on 24 March 1984, following the opening of the fifth phase of the network, between Heworth and South Shields.

History
The station was opened by the North Eastern Railway on 1 March 1872, following the opening of the branch line between Pelaw and South Shields. 

The branch line, previously operated by steam, was electrified using a third-rail system in March 1938. In January 1963, the route reverted to diesel operation under British Rail, owing to decreasing ridership and increased operating costs.

Following closure for conversion to the Tyne and Wear Metro on 1 June 1981, the station was subsequently demolished and rebuilt.

Jarrow is situated on a single line section of track, but has a long passing loop for Tyne and Wear Metro services, and therefore two platforms. On the north side of the station is a single-track line used by freight services.

Metro Flow Development
During the 2020 Budget, the UK Government announced an investment of £95million towards the £103million Metro Flow project, which aims to increase capacity by up to 30,000 passenger journeys per day, and improve reliability on the branch line between Pelaw and South Shields. From September 2022, the project will include upgrading and electrifying a currently freight-only line, doubling three sections of single track between Pelaw and Bede, and purchasing four extra trains in addition to the 42 which have already been funded.

Facilities
The station has two platforms, both of which have ticket machines (which accept cash, card and contactless payment), smartcard validators, sheltered waiting area, seating, next train audio and visual displays, timetable and information posters and an emergency help point. There is step-free access to both platforms by ramp, with platforms also accessed by footbridge. The station has free car park, with 23 spaces (plus two accessible spaces). There is also cycle storage at the station, with five cycle lockers and six cycle pods.

Services
, the station is served by up to five trains per hour on weekdays and Saturday, and up to four trains per hour during the evening and on Sunday between South Shields and St James via Whitley Bay.

Rolling stock used: Class 599 Metrocar

Bus station

Jarrow bus station is located adjacent to the Metro station. It is served by local bus operators: Go North East and Stagecoach. Their routes serve South Tyneside, Sunderland and Newcastle-upon-Tyne. The bus station has five departure stands (lettered A–E), each of which has a waiting shelter, seating, next bus information displays, and timetable posters.

Refurbishment
Between November 2014 and March 2015, work was undertaken as part of a £120,000 refurbishment project – improving waiting areas, lighting and security.

Art

Outside the station is Vince Rea's Jarrow March (1984) art installation, which commemorates the 207 people who, in October 1936, walked from Tyneside to London to protest about the lack of jobs in the area. The work is made from steel recycled from a scrapped ship.

Notes

References

Sources

External links
 
 Timetable and station information for Jarrow

1872 establishments in England
Railway stations in Great Britain opened in 1872
1984 establishments in England
Railway stations in Great Britain opened in 1984
Tyne and Wear Metro Yellow line stations
Transport in Tyne and Wear
Former North Eastern Railway (UK) stations
